James Price (1752–1783) was an English chemist and alchemist who claimed to be able to turn mercury into silver or gold. When challenged to perform the conversion in front of credible witnesses for a second time, he instead committed suicide by drinking prussic acid.

Early life
Born in London in 1752, he was initially called James Higginbotham but changed his name to Price following the wishes of a relative who had died and left him a legacy. He attended Oxford University and, although no records of his early education or his research at Oxford exist, had a brilliant career there. He became a Master of Arts at 25 and the university made him a Doctor of Medicine in 1778, particularly for his work in the field of chemistry. In 1781, at the age of 29, he became a member of the Royal Society.

Work on transmutation
In the following year, he appears to have been working on the transmutation of base metals into precious metals and on 6 May 1782, after revealing his findings to a few of his friends, he began a series of public experiments hosted at his laboratory in Guildford. He demonstrated that he could produce precious metals by mixing borax, nitre, and a red or white powder of his own devising (known as the powder of production) with fifty times its own weight in mercury and stirring the mixture in a crucible with an iron rod. Mixing in the red powder produced gold; the white powder, silver. He performed seven of the public demonstrations (the final one being on 25 May 1782) which were attended by the elite:  peers, clergymen, lawyers, and chemists. Some of the gold produced during the experiments was presented to George III. The accounts of the experiments were published with great success.

Challenged by other Fellows
The Fellows of the Royal Society were less convinced, however, and asked him to repeat the experiments in the presence of some of the members of the society. Price seemed less than happy to do this. He claimed that his powders were exhausted and preparation of new samples would cost him time and money and be damaging to his health. He also protested that the cost of preparing the gold or silver by this method was not economical, as it cost £17 to make an ounce of gold, which was only valued at £4. The Royal Society insisted on the repetition of the experiments and reminded Price that, as a member, he was calling the honour of the society into question. Price rebuked them, claiming that his reputation and position in society should prevent any hint of suspicion from being cast upon the veracity of his claims, but eventually he was forced to submit.

Events leading to ingestion of poison
In January 1783, Price returned to his laboratory in Guildford, ostensibly to start production of the miraculous powders. In fact, he set about the distillation of laurel water (which contained prussic acid). He wrote his will at the same time, but it was another six months before he returned to London to invite members of the Royal Society to witness the experiment on 3 August in his laboratory in Guildford.

Despite the success of his initial demonstrations and the furor they had caused, only three members turned up in Guildford on the appointed day. Although clearly disappointed by the poor turnout, Price welcomed the three men and then, stepping to one side, drank the flask of laurel water he had prepared. The three men immediately noticed a change in his appearance, but before they could do anything, Price was dead.

References

New Scientist, Dec 24–31, 1987

English alchemists
18th-century English chemists
Scientists from London
Suicides by cyanide poisoning
Fellows of the Royal Society
1752 births
1783 deaths
18th-century alchemists